The Sunday Guardian is an Indian Sunday newspaper, founded by journalist and politician M. J. Akbar, and currently owned by iTV Network. It was launched on 31 January 2010 from New Delhi and is printed in New Delhi, Mumbai and Chandigarh. The 40-page newspaper is divided into two sections of 20 pages each: The Sunday Guardian and Guardian 20. Together, they offer a mix of news, investigation, opinion, entertainment, lifestyle and issues of human interest.

The newspaper is now a part of iTV Network,  which also runs the India News and NewsX channels.

Content
It was the first to report about the controversy surrounding the allotment of coal blocks in November 2011. The news item "CBI did not probe fodder allegations against Bihar CM" (29 September 2013) was picked up by other media outlets and created a stir in Patna.

This newspaper was the first to report that there existed a note by the National Investigation Agency saying that Lashkar-e-Tayyiba terrorist David Headley had mentioned Ishrat Jahan’s name as an LeT terrorist. A few other widely discussed news reports include Congress chalks out anyone but Modi strategy (5 January 2014), "PMO unconcerned about scientist deaths" (26 October 2013), "Ragging, harassment a ‘tradition’ at Naval Academy" (19 May 2013).

The "Comment & Analysis" pages of the newspaper start with M.J. Akbar’s weekly column "Byline". The pages also have columns by senior jurist and Rajya Sabha member Ram Jethmalani, strategic affairs expert M.D. Nalapat, security expert V. Balachandran, veteran journalists Saeed Naqvi and Virendra Kapoor, scholars Monika Chansoria, Debotri Dhar and Raziuddin Aquil and academic Vivek Gumaste. Former Pakistan ambassador to the United States and United Kingdom Maleeha Lodhi is also a columnist. Nora Chopra’s writes a diary on politics and politicians in the "Covert" section. Cricket expert Dileep Premachandran gives his insight in "Sports Guardian". "Business Guardian" features stock broking tips from financial expert Rajiv Kapoor.

Notable columnists
 M.J. Akbar
 M.D. Nalapat

References

External links
 

Sunday newspapers
2010 establishments in Delhi
English-language newspapers published in India
Newspapers published in Delhi
Publications established in 2010